Eric Bennett Hertz (31 December 1954 – 30 March 2013) was an American, and the CEO of 2degrees, New Zealand's third largest mobile telecommunications company.

Hertz was responsible for the installation of the first cellular phone system in Portland, Maine in the 1980s. His future wife, Kathy, worked in a management role for AT&T in New York and New Jersey; they married in 1983. He worked for BellSouth in Ecuador, where he learnt to speak Spanish fluently.

Hertz moved to New Zealand with his wife and daughter in 2009 and had acquired permanent residency, calling New Zealand home. In his opinion, quality of life in New Zealand was unequalled and he "didn't know why people leave".

Under his leadership 2degrees grew its customer base to over one million connections.

Hertz and his wife, Katherine (Kathy) Marie Picone Hertz, died following the ditching of their twin-engine Beechcraft Baron near Kawhia Harbour on Saturday, 30 March 2013 NZDT.

The plane was found at the bottom of the sea off the coast of Kawhia,  underwater on 2 April. In a statement, Hertz's family thanked New Zealanders for their support. Hertz was succeeded as CEO of 2degrees by chairman Stewart Sherriff.

Navy diving ship HMNZS Manawanui was sent to the site of the submerged plane on 5 April, and local iwi put a rāhui on the area.

References

External links

Obituary, Seattle Times

1954 births
2013 deaths
New Zealand chief executives
Victims of aviation accidents or incidents in New Zealand
Wharton School of the University of Pennsylvania alumni
Accidents and incidents involving the Beechcraft Baron